The Tentaxina are a subtribe of moths of the family Erebidae. The clade was described by Michael Fibiger in 2011.

Taxonomy
The subtribe was originally described as the subfamily Tentaxinae of the family Micronoctuidae.

Genera
Acusa Fibiger, 2011
Tentasetae Fibiger, 2011
Pseudobscura Fibiger, 2011
Parens Fibiger, 2011
Alienia Fibiger, 2011
Tentaspina Fibiger, 2011
Tentax Fibiger, 2011
Flax Fibiger, 2011

References

Micronoctuini
Lepidoptera subtribes